BRAC University (also known as BracU) is a private research university located in Dhaka, Bangladesh. It was established in 2001 as a branch of Sir Fazle Hasan Abed's BRAC under the Private University Act 1992.

History 
Sir Fazle Hasan Abed founded Brac University in 2001, under the Private University Act. Located at 66 Mohakhali, Dhaka, the university is based on the American liberal arts college model. Brac University began with three departments and around 80 students in 2001. It held its first Convocation in January 2006. Initially, it offered a limited number of bachelor's degrees. As the university grew, it increased the number of programs and introduced master's degrees. The development of a library with high academic standards was important to Sir Abed. The Ayesha Abed Library was digitized shortly after its inception. The university had 11,200 students in 20 schools, departments, and institutes in 2020. The construction of a new campus will be completed at the end of 2023.

Campus

Residential Campus 
The Residential Campus in Savar was founded in 2003 and substantially expanded in 2012. Students spend a semester on the Residential Campus, where they take specific courses and fulfill community tasks during the week. Residential Semester is mandatory for every students. On Friday and Saturday, they visit orphanages, nursing homes, and landmark sites. In Bangladesh, many students stay with their parents during their university years.

Resources and facilities 
 Ayesha Abed Library
 Counseling Unit at RS
 Courseware Moodle
 Fabrication Lab* GDLN Centre
 MSDN Academic Allience

Underconstruction city campus 
Brac University is building a sustainable green campus in Merul Badda, Dhaka, a campus designed by WOHA Designs Pte Ltd., an architectural firm based in Singapore. Construction of this facility began in 2017. The university building will have 13 floors and a total area of 157,935 sq. meters. The facilities include an auditorium with 700 seats, a multipurpose hall with 1850 seats, classrooms, labs, design studios, lecture theaters, an IT data center, UPS, CCTVs, a cafeteria, an e-library, a parking lot, recreation facilities, and a rooftop playground. The new campus is 2017 LafargeHolcim Asia Pacific- Bronze Winner awarded by LafargeHolcim Foundation for Sustainable Construction. It will open soon. 

Brac University has also planned a medical school in Dhaka Village. This separate campus will occupy 56 acres.

Organization and administration

Leadership and management 
The current structure was established in 2011. The President of Bangladesh is Brac University's Chancellor. The board of trustees is the highest policy-making body of Brac University. It has 12 members, one of them being the Vice-Chancellor. Chaired by the Vice-Chancellor, the Syndicate supervises the academic and administrative functions of the university. The Academic Council, also chaired by the Vice-Chancellor, makes education policy recommendations and reviews curricula and academic progress.

Administration 
The university administration is led by the Vice-Chancellor, the Registrar, and the Heads of academic units.

Vice Chancellors

Academics 
Diverse academic units serve the mission of Brac University. Departments have degree-granting programs, schools support strategic initiatives, institutes are autonomous research entities, and centers are project-based entities.

Schools and institutes 

Brac Business School
Brac Institute of Educational Development
Brac Institute of Governance and Development
Brac Institute of Languages
Graduate School of Management
James P. Grant School of Public Health
School of Architecture and Design
School of Data and Sciences
School of Engineering
School of Humanities and Social Sciences
School of Law
School of Life Sciences

Departments 
Department of Architecture
Department of Computer Science and Engineering
Department of Economics and Social Sciences (School of Humanities and Social Sciences)
Department of Electrical and Electronic Engineering
Department of English and Humanities (School of Humanities and Social Sciences)
Department of Mathematics and Natural Sciences
Department of Pharmacy
Department of Bachelor of Business Administration

Centres 
Centre for Climate Change and Environmental Research
Centre for Emotional Intelligence and Innovation
Centre for Entrepreneurship Development
Centre for Inclusive Architecture and Urbanism
Centre for Peace and Justice
Professional Development Centre
Centre for Mathematical Sciences

Faculty
The faculty has included scholars such as petroleum engineer Mohammad Tamim and sociologist Piash Karim.

Financial aid 
Brac University was founded to support financially disadvantaged students. One of the early donors was the BRAC Ford scholarship program. The university has developed several scholarship programs for national and international students. The Open Society Foundation and the Open Society University Network have supported student activities and education.

Student life 
The Office of Student Life (OSL) was created in 2019. OSL supervises the Department of Career Services, Alumni Affairs, and Clubs & Societies.
Student involvement in militancy: A former student of the university was involved in the attack on an upscale restaurant in Gulshan in 2016.

References

External links
 
 Ayesha Abed Library, BRAC University
 BRAC University USIS

 
Universities and colleges in Dhaka
BRAC (organisation)
Private universities in Bangladesh
Motijheel Thana
Educational institutions established in 2001
2001 establishments in Bangladesh
Sustainable architecture
Sustainable building by country
Educational institutions by country
Educational institutions by continent